Ridhima or Ridheema is an Indian feminine given name. It may refer to:
 Ridhima Dilawari, Indian golfer
 Ridhima Ghosh (born 1989), Indian Bengali actress
 Ridhima Pandey (born 2008), Indian environmental activist
 Ridhima Pandit (born 1990), Indian actress and model
 Ridheema Tiwari (born 1984), Indian television actress